Alicia anisopetala is a South American liana, a type of woody vine.

Despite its availability from online sellers and marketing as "black" ayahuasca, it has been poorly studied and lacks an established safety profile.

Alicia anisopetala has not been found to contain harmala alkaloids and its toxicity remains unknown.

See also
List of psychoactive plants
Ayahuasca

References

Malpighiaceae